Multan Cantt or Multan Cantonment is a cantonment in the Multan District, adjacent to Multan city, in Punjab province, eastern Pakistan. Multan Cantt is located in the city's southwest.

Multan Cantt is reachable via Sher Shah Road and it's the area of industrial estate also. If you want to reach the Multan industrial area then you will have to travel via Sher Shah Road in Multan and reach there. All FGEIS schools are also located on the Sher Shah Road, Multan. 

The cantonment contains bazaars including Sadar Bazaar for shopping having many shops, commercial buildings and super markets and restaurants. It has railway station and international airport. The cantonment has a park, Cantonment Garden, also called Cantt Garden or Company Garden. The Jheel (lake) at Fort Park is also located in Multan Cantt. There are also many villas and housing schemes in the city. It has schools, colleges and many educational institutions.

Multan Cantt is one of the most populous areas in Multan same as Gulgasht Colony, Qasim Bela, Gulshan Market and Hussain Agahi Bazaar. Sohan Halwa is the famous food of the cantonment.

Bazaars

Sadar Bazaar
Sadar Bazaar is the second most eminent market of Multan Cantt after Hussin Agahi Bazaar. This bazaar holds premium products which are not obtainable elsewhere in Multan. It holds about all the possessions of everyday use, therefore containing all sorts of shops like cloth houses, electronic shops, perfume shops. Sadar Bazaar road is a one way road extended from Tipu Sultan Road to Mehfooz Chowk.

Sadar Bazaar shopping:
 She Shop
 Mehboob Bakers
 Rays Garments Multan
 Mehfooz Pan Shop
 Salman Brothers Army Shield Makers
 Budget Shop

Linking Roads:
 Tipu Sultan Road
 Ghani Bukhari Road
 Opal Shaheed Road

Churi Bazaar
Churi Bazaar, also an eminent market of Multan Cantt, known for the street of bangles, and also refers as Sadar Bazaar. It also contains many shops including shops of bangles, clothes, jewelry, laces and earrings.

Linking Roads:
 Ban Bazaar Road
 Jamia Masjid Road
 Sadar Bazaar Road

Sarafa Bazar
Sarafa Bazaar started at the end of Sadar Bazaar. It is also a one-way road extended from Mehfooz Chowk to Bomanji Chowk. Sarafa Bazaar is also known as "Dahi Bhalla Bazaar" because it has many Dahi Bhalla shops there. It also has shops of canvas, shoes, sports and medical stores.

Linking Roads:
 Opal Saheed Road
 Nusrat Road

Gardens

Cantt Garden

Cantt Garden also known as Cantonment Garden or Company Garden is a beautiful garden in Multan. It is located on Club Road near Service Club, called MGM. It is contains jogging tracks for jogging, canteens for light foods and kindergartens rides, slides and swings for children. The garden has fountains, trees and a mini zoo.

A Flower show is held every year in the months of March and April for the welcoming of spring season. It includes exhibition of beautiful and colorful flowers. Live singing and dancing concerts also are held at night during flower show.

Fort Park
Fort park, also known as Chaman Zar Askari Lake or Jheel is located on Sher Shah road in Cantt. It also one of the beautiful parks in Multan. It contains lake for boat riding, rides for children and elders, canteens and mini zoo.

Lalak Jaan Shaheed Park
Lalak Jaan Shaheed Park is located at Emperial Chowk near Cantonment Multan Hospital. It is a smaller park than Cantt Garden and Fort Park in Cantt. This park is a tribute to Havaldar Lalak Jan Shaheed, the recent recipient of Nishan-e-Haider military award.

Mosques

Cantt consists of a number of beautiful mosques. Cantt Eid Gah Mosque is a big mosque of Cantt. Following is the list of Mosques in Multan Cantt:
 Cantt Eid Gah Mosque Nusrat Road
 Laal Masjid/Jamia Masjid Cantt
 Jamia Masjid Abdul Shakoor
 Masjid Fatimat-ul-Zahra, Bohra Street
 Masjid Abu Muhammad, Mall Road
 Masjid Anujuman, Nusrat Road
 Ghousia Majid, Allama Iqbal Town
 Jamia Masjid Peer Waali
 Masjid Ibraheem
 Madina Masjid

Churches
Cantt also has two churches

St. Mary's Cathedral & Bishop's House
St. Mary's Cathedral & Bishop's House is a cathedral church. It is most beautiful and biggest church in Multan. It is located near Cantonment Multan Hospital opposite Federal Boys School branch 1.

Multan Cathedral
Multan Cathedral is a church located at Aurangzeb Road opposite Federal Boys School branch 2 and also one of the beautiful churches.

Commercial Buildings and Markets
 Bomanji Square
 Service Club Multan/Multan Garrison Mess
 Radio Pakistan, Multan
 Khan Center
 Khawar Center
 Mall Plaza
 Khan Plaza
 Fashion Mall
 City Center
 McDonald's Restaurant

Hospitals
 Combined Military Hospital (CMH), Multan
 Christian Hospital, Multan

Educational Institutions

Schools
 Army Public School
 FG Boys High School No.1
 FG Boys High School No.2
 FG Girls High School
 FG Public High School
 FG Public Junior High School
 Nusrat-ul-Islam Girls High School
 Nusrat-ul-Islam Boys High School
 Zaib Foundation High School

Colleges
 Army Public Degree College for Boys
 FG Degree College for Boys
 FG Degree Women College
 Nusrat-ul-Islam Girls College

Universities
 Air University (Multan Campus)

Flyovers and Roads

Flyovers
 Yousuf Raza Gillani Flyover is longest flyover in Punjab province and 2nd largest flyover in Pakistan. Ground breaking of this flyover was done by former prime minister of Pakistan Yousuf Raza Gillani on the new year ceremony on Saturday, 31 December 2011. It was built at a cost of around Rs.1.6 billion rupees. It is the part of Inner Ring Road Multan project. It is a four lane flyover with partitions. Two one ways of two lanes each. Length of the flyover is 1.6 km (excluding length of extra three ramps). There are three extra ramps connecting to the main flyover.
 Railway Flyover is an old flyover in Multan located on Cantt Railway Station. It extended from Aziz Hotel to Double Phatak Chowk.

Roads

Sports
 Ayub Stadium
 CMH Sports Grounds
 Railway Ground

Railway Station

Multan Cantonment railway station or Multan Chaoni railway station is the principal railway station Multan, located on the railway road. It is a major railway station of Pakistan Railway located on Karachi-Peshawar main railway line. The station is staffed and has advance and current reservation offices. Food stalls are also located on it platforms.

Named Passenger Trains

International Airport

Multan International Airport is situated at Qasim Bela road. It was originally built to cater mainly to the population of Multan, however as the airport gained much popularity traffic from surrounding areas which included Shujabad, Vehari, Lodhran, Khanewal, Mian Channu, Shorkot, Muzaffargarh, Kot Adu, Layyah, Rajanpur, Burewala, Chichawatni and Sahiwal.

Airlines and destinations

See also
 Cantonments of Pakistan
 Multan
 Multan District
 Multan Saddar

References

.military
Cantonments of Pakistan
Populated places in Multan District